Metrostar or Metrostars may refer to:

Sports
New York Red Bulls, formerly called the "MetroStars", a soccer team from New York
DEG Metro Stars, German hockey club
Manila Metrostars, a Philippine basketball team
Mississauga MetroStars, a defunct professional indoor soccer team that played in the Major Arena Soccer League
North Eastern MetroStars, a football club from Adelaide, South Australia which plays in the National Premier League South Australia

Other uses
MetroStar Award, a French-Canadian award for television, now known as the Artis Award
Manila Metro Rail Transit System Line 3, popularly called "The Metrostar Express", a part of the metropolitan rail system in Manila
Metrostar Ferry, a passenger ferry service on Manila Bay

See also
Metro FC (disambiguation)